Tomás Aurelio Gil Martínez (born 23 May 1977) is a Venezuelan former professional track and road cyclist, who rode professionally between 2012 and 2016 for the  and  teams. Since retiring, Gil has worked as a directeur sportif for UCI ProTeam  between 2017 and 2021, and is scheduled to work in the same role for UCI WorldTeam  from the 2023 season.

Major results
Source: 

1998
 2nd  Team pursuit, Central American and Caribbean Games
2002
 Central American and Caribbean Games
2nd  Team pursuit
3rd  Madison (with Miguel Ubeto)
2003
 3rd Overall Vuelta a Venezuela
2004
 Pan American Track Championships
2nd  Individual pursuit
2nd  Team pursuit
 National Road Championships
2nd Time trial
3rd Road race
 5th Overall Vuelta a Cuba
1st Stage 11a (ITT)
2005
 1st Stage 3 Rutas del Vino
2006
 1st  Time trial, National Road Championships
 1st Clasico Ciudad de Valencia
 Central American and Caribbean Games
2nd  Team pursuit
3rd  Individual pursuit
3rd  Time trial
 3rd  Team pursuit, Pan American Track Championships
2007
 National Road Championships
1st  Road race
3rd Time trial
 1st Overall Vuelta al Estado Portugesa
1st Stage 5a
 1st Stage 3 Vuelta al Estado Yaracuy
 Pan American Games
2nd  Individual pursuit
3rd  Team pursuit
 Pan American Track Championships
2nd  Team pursuit
2nd  Individual pursuit
 3rd  Individual time trial, Pan American Road Championships
 3rd Overall Vuelta a Venezuela
2008
 1st  Time trial, National Road Championships
 1st Clásico Gobernación de Anzoátegui
 1st Stage 2 Clasico Pedro Infante
 2nd Overall Vuelta a los Valles de Tuy
1st Stage 2
 7th Clasico FVCiclismo Corre Por la VIDA
 10th Overall Vuelta a la Independencia Nacional
2009
 1st Overall Vuelta a Lara
1st Stage 1a (TTT)
 2nd Overall Vuelta al Táchira
2010
 1st  Time trial, Central American and Caribbean Games
 1st  Time trial, National Road Championships
 1st  Overall Vuelta a Venezuela
1st Stage 8
 South American Games
5th Time trial
10th Road race
2011
 1st  Overall Vuelta a la Independencia Nacional
1st Stage 6b (ITT)
 2nd Time trial, National Road Championships
 3rd  Time trial, Pan American Road Championships
 8th Time trial, Pan American Games
2012
 1st  Time trial, National Road Championships
 1st Stage 2 Vuelta al Táchira
 10th Time trial, Pan American Road Championships
2014
 3rd Time trial, National Road Championships
2015
 3rd Time trial, National Road Championships

Grand Tour general classification results timeline

Notes

References

External links
 
 
 
 
 
 
 

1977 births
Living people
Venezuelan male cyclists
Venezuelan track cyclists
Olympic cyclists of Venezuela
Cyclists at the 2012 Summer Olympics
Pan American Games medalists in cycling
Pan American Games silver medalists for Venezuela
Pan American Games bronze medalists for Venezuela
Cyclists at the 1999 Pan American Games
Cyclists at the 2007 Pan American Games
Cyclists at the 2011 Pan American Games
Medalists at the 2007 Pan American Games
Central American and Caribbean Games medalists in cycling
Central American and Caribbean Games silver medalists for Venezuela
Central American and Caribbean Games bronze medalists for Venezuela
Competitors at the 1998 Central American and Caribbean Games
Competitors at the 2002 Central American and Caribbean Games
Competitors at the 2006 Central American and Caribbean Games
Competitors at the 2010 Central American and Caribbean Games
Sportspeople from Caracas
20th-century Venezuelan people
21st-century Venezuelan people